John Vincent Ruane (October 4, 1936 – September 3, 2006) was an American jockey in Thoroughbred horse racing.

Ruane began his career in 1957, competing on the New York State racing circuit where he rode for noted U.S. Racing Hall of Fame horse trainers such as John M. Gaver, Sr. and H. Allen Jerkens. He retired after forty-two years having ridden winners of a number of important Graded stakes races.

A native of County Mayo, Ireland, in 1958 John Ruane received recognition for his racing success in America at a ceremony in Belmont Park where Irish government representatives presented him with a piece of Waterford Crystal marked with the official Connaught Crest.

John Ruane was living in Ocean City, New Jersey at the time of his death from pulmonary complications in 2006.

References

1936 births
2006 deaths
Deaths from respiratory failure
American jockeys
Irish emigrants to the United States
Sportspeople from County Mayo
People from Ocean City, New Jersey